Vunisea Airport  is an airport located near Vunisea (Namalata) on Kadavu Island in Fiji. Also known as Namalata Airport or Kadavu Airport, it serves many tourists surfing and kayaking in Fiji. It is operated by Airports Fiji Limited.

Facilities

Airlines and destinations

References

External links
 Kadavu Airport Pictures
 

Airports in Fiji
Kadavu Group